Clarkson is an unincorporated community in Howard County, Maryland, United States. A postal office operated in the community from 14 September 1889 to 31 October 1931. Clarkson was the site of strategic simulations by the U.S. Army in 1922 training manuals.

See also
Columbia, Maryland

References

Year of establishment missing
Unincorporated communities in Howard County, Maryland
Unincorporated communities in Maryland